Strikes and Gutters is an album by Pittsburgh rock band The Clarks, their first outtake album. It was released in 2001.

Track listing 
 "Roses and Diesel"
 "Talk of the Town"
 "The Deal"
 "Lock & Key"
 "Apartment Song"
 "Does Your Harbour Light Still Shine?"
 "Little Sanctuary"
 "Over Me"
 "Reves Arabesque"
 "Mother's Only Son"
 "Tonite"
 "The Blizzard"
 "Give Me Tonight"

Personnel 
 Scott Blasey - lead vocals, electric & acoustic guitars
 Rob James - electric & acoustic guitars, vocals
 Greg Joseph - bass guitar, vocals
 Dave Minarik - drums, vocals

2001 albums
The Clarks albums